Odd Bengtsson (born 19 February 1959) is a Swedish boxer. He competed in the men's featherweight event at the 1980 Summer Olympics. At the 1980 Summer Olympics, he lost to Adolfo Horta of Cuba.

References

1959 births
Living people
Swedish male boxers
Olympic boxers of Sweden
Boxers at the 1980 Summer Olympics
Sportspeople from Stockholm
Featherweight boxers
20th-century Swedish people